Viola blanda, commonly called the sweet white violet, is a flowering perennial plant in the Violet family (Violaceae).  It is native to parts of south-eastern and south-central Canada and the eastern, and north-central, United States. Its natural habitat is in cool, mesic forests.

Description
The sweet white violet grows from 6 to 12 inches high. They grow small white flowers in spring and early summer. The lower petals have purple veins. The upper petals are often twisted or bent backwards. The stalks are a reddish tinged. They grow 1-2 inch long heart shaped leaves with a few scattered hairs.

The white violet has demonstrated a weak ability to respond to climate change by shifting its flowering time in some areas of its range.

References

blanda
Flora of the United States